Henry Harold Alessio (22 December 1895 – 16 February 1973) was an Australian rules footballer.

Playing career
Alessio, a North Melbourne junior, played 38 games for Richmond in the Victorian Football League between 1915 and 1919.

References

External links

1895 births
1973 deaths
Australian rules footballers from Melbourne
Australian Rules footballers: place kick exponents
Richmond Football Club players
People from Fitzroy, Victoria